Lindy Hou, OAM (born 18 February 1960)  is an Australian tandem cyclist and triathlete from Hong Kong. Arriving in Australia with her family in 1974, she was diagnosed with retinitis pigmentosa in the mid-1980s and became legally blind in 1996. She has won six medals at the 2004 and 2008 Summer Paralympics.

Personal
Hou was born in Hong Kong on 2 March 1960. Her parents, who came from the southern provinces of China, moved to Hong Kong in 1960 and the family emigrated to Australia in 1974. In the mid-1980s, she was diagnosed with retinitis pigmentosa, and she became legally blind in 1996. Before the deterioration of her eyesight, she was a competitive triathlete and triathlon coach, twice competing as an Australian Age Group Representative, and worked in the information technology industry. She lives in Canberra, having previously lived in Sydney, and works as a massage therapist and a motivational speaker. She has served as an Australia Day and Chinese New Year festival ambassador.

Sport
Hou took up tandem cycling in 1999, and first competed in the sport for Australia in 2001. She narrowly missed out on selection for the 2000 Sydney Games. After the games, she created the "Athens Express" Tandem Cycling Team, consisting of her and her pilots Janelle Lindsay for sprints and kilo events and Toireasa Gallagher for pursuit and road races.

At the 2004 Athens Games, she won a gold medal in the Women's Sprint Tandem B1–3 event, for which she received a Medal of the Order of Australia, two silver medals in the Women's Road Race / Time Trial Tandem B1–3 and Women's Individual Pursuit Tandem B1–3 events, and a bronze medal in the Women's 1 km Time Trial Tandem B1–3 event. After the Athens games, Ryan became her only pilot. In 2006, she won two gold medals at the World Cycling Championships. At the 2008 Beijing Games, she won a silver medal in the Women's Individual Pursuit B VI 1–3 event and a bronze medal in the Women's 1 km Time Trial B VI 1–3 event. She retired from Paralympic cycling after the Beijing games, and was named the Female Para-Cyclist of the Year for 2008 at the Cycling Australia Awards. She has been on five long-distance bike rides for charities, including one for Retina Australia from the Gold Coast to Sydney in September 2011.

Returning to her first sport of triathlon, she was selected to represent Australia at the 2012 ITU Paratriathlon World Championships, racing in the TRI-6 (visually impaired) classification. She withdrew due to injury. The sole female TRI-6 competitor in the inaugural Australian Paratriathlon Championships, held in January 2013, Hou was selected to race in the 2013 ITU Triathlon World Championships in London, where she and guide Maureen Cummings carried the Australian flag during the opening ceremony. She did not medal in the race. At the 2014 Australian and Oceania championships, Hou won her classification.

Along with Michael Milton, she is one of two athlete members of the Triathlon Australia Paratriathlon Committee, which aims to develop the sport following its inclusion in the 2016 Rio de Janeiro Paralympics.

References

External links
Lindy Hou's Website

Australian female cyclists
Paralympic cyclists of Australia
Paratriathletes of Australia
Australian female triathletes
Cyclists at the 2004 Summer Paralympics
Cyclists at the 2008 Summer Paralympics
Medalists at the 2004 Summer Paralympics
Medalists at the 2008 Summer Paralympics
Paralympic gold medalists for Australia
Paralympic silver medalists for Australia
Paralympic bronze medalists for Australia
Paralympic medalists in cycling
Visually impaired category Paralympic competitors
Recipients of the Medal of the Order of Australia
Hong Kong emigrants to Australia
Australian people of Chinese descent
Sportswomen from New South Wales
Cyclists from Sydney
Sportswomen from the Australian Capital Territory
Sportspeople from Canberra
Cyclists from the Australian Capital Territory
Australian blind people
1960 births
Living people